Leandro Nicolas Diaz  may refer to:

 Leandro Díaz (footballer, born 1990), Uruguayan footballer
 Leandro Díaz (footballer, born 1992), Argentine footballer